Agent Anna is a New Zealand comedy-drama television series, created by Maxine Fleming with Vanessa Alexander and devised by Robyn Malcolm. It is produced by Great Southern Film and Television and funded by NZ on Air and Television New Zealand. It began airing its first series of six episodes in New Zealand on 31 January 2013. NZ on Air announced on 12 August 2013 that the show received funding for a second series of 10 episodes.

Premise 
Anna Kingston's husband has left her and their two teenage daughters and gone to Australia leaving behind substantial debts. The family home has been sold, leaving the family to move into Anna's parents' basement. Armed with a new real estate agent's diploma and a motivational CD, Anna gets a job in an Auckland real estate office. Her co-workers steal her listings and treat her poorly, her daughters miss their previous private school, and her mother is unsympathetic.

Cast and characters

Main cast
 Robyn Malcolm as Anna Kingston
 Adam Gardiner as Leon Cruickshank – Eden Realty's top selling agent.
 Theresa Healey as Sandi Wright – Eden Realty's resident cougar agent.
 Roy Billing as Clinton Walker – Anna's boss, He owns Eden Realty. He agreed to be paid at New Zealand rates.

Recurring cast 
 Kayleigh Haworth as Bree Walker – Clint and Sandi's 19-year-old daughter, She's the receptionist at Eden Realty.
 Floyd Alexander Hunt as Charlotte "Charlie" Kingston – Anna's 17-year-old daughter. (series 1; guest: series 2)
 Molly Leishman as Bella Kingston – Anna's 14-year-old daughter.
 Janice Finn as Jeanette Dryden – Anna's mother.
 Ian Mune as Neil Dryden – Anna's father.
 Sally Stockwell as Claire - Anna's friend.

Guest cast 
 Ingrid Park as Erica Ball
 Bruce Phillips as John Ball
 Peter Feeney as Adrian
 Louise Wallace as Amanda
 Micheala Rooney as Katherine
 James Gaylyn as Motivational speaker
 John Leigh as James Finlayson
 Cameron Rhodes as Charles Jordan
 Lisa Chappell as Marna
 Fasitua Amosa as Sione
 Hwei Ling Ow as Candy Lin
 Greg Johnson as Daniel Kingston (3 episodes) – Anna's ex-husband.
 Dwayne Cameron as Rory O'Conner
 Jodie Rimmer as Liz – A woman who sells Anna her dream home.
 Alison Quigan as Edith – Anna's aunt, who gives Anna her first paid sale.
 Peter Elliott as Cameron Glover – A property developer.

Series overview

Series 1 (2013)

Series 2 (2014)

Broadcast 
In Australia, the show premiered on 7Two on 15 January 2014., while series 2 eventually premiered shortly after midnight on 2 January 2018 on 7flix (free-to-air channel 76).

Reception 
The number of viewers was good by New Zealand standards. Chris Philpott in On the Box says "Malcolm catches the vulnerability, the humanity, at the core of Anna Kingston, and she sells the despair that this former housewife is going through," and he thought the first episode was well-structured. Michelle Hewitson in The New Zealand Herald wrote "it's a rather sweet, giggly little blonde number with not a lot of substance, but who cares? It's obvious Malcolm is having a lot of fun." She thought it was about time for a comedy about the city's "overheated" property market. In contrast, Jane Bowron wrote in The Dominion Post that "the first episode was as hard to sell as a real estate agent's first house sale" and criticised it for being set in Auckland rather than more typical New Zealand, and dealing with a woman who had been out of the workforce for 20 years, which is no longer common for New Zealand women. Nick Grant, also in the Herald, says "[Initially Anna is] little more than a hapless doormat, which at best is more likely to attract a somewhat impatient sympathy than outright affection" but suggests the show will "map [her] journey to independent assertiveness." Diana Wichtel in The New Zealand Listener says "This quiet comedy is in danger of being overshadowed by something sexier", but says she intends to keep watching it.

Notes 
  Number includes additional viewers from a 9:30 p.m. rebroadcast airing the same night on TV One Plus 1.

References

External links 
 
 

2010s New Zealand television series
2013 New Zealand television series debuts
2014 New Zealand television series endings
English-language television shows
New Zealand comedy-drama television series
Television shows funded by NZ on Air
Television shows set in Auckland
TVNZ 1 original programming
Fictional real estate brokers